The Minister for Business, Industry and Innovation is a cabinet minister within the Swedish government and appointed by the Prime Minister of Sweden. The cabinet minister is head of the Ministry of Enterprise and Innovation. The current minister for business, industry and innovation is Ebba Busch from the Christian Democrats, who has held the office since 18 October 2022.

History
Until 1991, the office was named minister of industry. However, the official name since then is minister has been especially responsible for business, industry, enterprise and innovation. Since 2014, the minister has been especially responsible for business, industry, enterprise and innovation. This includes small and medium-sized businesses, state-owned enterprises and industrial policy.

List of Ministers for Enterprise

References

Government ministers of Sweden